Frederico Aguilar Alcuaz (June 6, 1932 – February 2, 2011) was a Filipino painter who exhibited extensively Internationally and whose work earned him recognition both in the Philippines and abroad.

Alcuaz was conferred the title of National Artist for Visual Arts, Painting, Sculpture and Mixed Media in 2009. However, four nominees for the award other than Alcuaz became embroiled in the 2009 National Artist of the Philippines Controversy, which led the Supreme Court of the Philippines to temporarily issue a status quo order on August 25, 2009, blocking the conferment of the awards on all seven nominees - despite the fact that no objections were ever raised regarding the conferment of the award to Alcuaz and two other nominees.

Education and personal life 
Federico Aguilar Alcuaz was born on June 6, 1932 in Santa Cruz, Manila. He was the 6th of 11 Children of Mariano Aguilar a Lawyer and a Musician and Encarnacion Alcuaz. He finished early schooling at the Dr. Albert Elementary School and San Beda High School. He studied law at the Ateneo de Manila and finished his degree in 1955. In 1949–1950 he took up painting subjects at the University of the Philippines (UP) School of Fine Arts. In 1955 he went to Madrid with a scholarship at the Academia de San Fernando which he got through the help of the Jesuits from the Ateneo de Manila. In 1956 he chose Barcelona as his career base. He also became a member of the La Punalada Group which counted among its members Tàpies, Cuixart and Tharrats. In the same year he began signing his paintings with Aguilar Alcuaz to distinguish himself from two other Aguilars who are also members of the La Punalada Group. In 1959, he met Ute Schmitz, whom he married 3 years later and they had 3 sons.

He died on February 2, 2011, in Manila, Philippines due to natural causes.

Awards 
1st Prize, UPCFA Art Competition, 1953
1ST Prize, Roadside Squatters, 4th SNSAC Modern Painting Category, 1954
1st Prize, Montcada Award Barcelona, 1957
Francisco Goya Award, Cercle Maillol Barcelona, 1958
Republic Cultural Heritage Award, 1965
2nd Prize Prix Vancell, 4th Biennial of Terrassa (Barcelona Spain),1959

Exhibitions (Philippines) 
Solo Exhibition, San Beda College, 1953
Solo Exhibition, Centro Escolar University, 1954
Solo Exhibition, PAG, 1955

Exhibitions (international) 
Solo Exhibition, Museum of Contemporary Art, Madrid, 1956
Solo Exhibition, Galerias Layetanas Barcelona, 1956
Solo Exhibition, Galerias Manila Barcelona, 1956
Solo Exhibition, Hispanic Cultural Hall Madrid, 1957
Solo Exhibition, Galerias Layetanas Barcelona, 1957
Solo Exhibition, Galeria Dintel, 1957
Solo Exhibition, Galeria Dintel, 1958
Exhibited at the Gallery of the City Hall of Burgos Spain, 1958
Solo Exhibition, Asociacion Artistica Vizcaina Bilbao, 1959
Solo Exhibition, Galeria Ilescas Bilbao, 1959
Solo Exhibition, Galeria Ilescas Bilbao, 1960
Solo Exhibition, Sala Vayreda Barcelona, 1960
Solo Exhibition, Galeria Ilescas Bilbao, 1962
Solo Exhibition, Galeria Ilescas Bilbao, 1972
Solo Exhibition, Museo de Bellas Artes de Bilbao (tapices), 1973
Solo Exhibition, Eindhoven (tapestries), 1973 (2)

References 

Duldulao, Manuel D. "Twentieth Century Filipino Artists" Legacy Publishers, Quezon City. 1995.
Muñoz Viñarás, Laureano. "Aguilar Alcuaz. Wandtapitjen", De Zormerwijzer, Eidhoven, 1973.

1932 births
2011 deaths
Ateneo de Manila University alumni
People from Santa Cruz, Manila
21st-century Filipino painters
Recipients of the Presidential Medal of Merit (Philippines)